This is a list of cultivars of the plant genus Grevillea.

A to E

F to J

K to O

P to R

S to Z

See also
 Lists of cultivars
 Ornamental plant

References

 
Grevillea
Grevillea
Grevillea
Lists of cultivars